The 2007 Irish Professional Championship was a professional invitational snooker tournament which took place in September 2007. The tournament was held at the Red Cow Exhibition Centre in Dublin, and featured sixteen exclusively Irish and Northern Irish players.

The last-16 and quarter-final matches were played over the best of nine frames, the semi-finals best of eleven and the final best of seventeen.

Two-time world champion and six-time Irish Professional champion Alex Higgins, now aged 58, entered the tournament for the third year in succession; his first-round loss to Fergal O'Brien would be the final competitive match he played before his death in 2010.

Ken Doherty won the event, beating O'Brien 9–2 in the final.

Main draw

Final

Century breaks

115, 111  Ken Doherty
107  Joe Delaney
106  David Morris

References

Irish Professional Championship
Irish Professional Championship
Irish Professional Championship
Irish Professional Championship